Elmet (or Elfed) was a sub-Roman, Brythonic kingdom in the north of England. In modern England, the name refers to an area of West Yorkshire, much smaller than the original kingdom.

Elmet may also refer to:

 Elmet (UK Parliament constituency), 1983–2010
 Elmet and Rothwell (UK Parliament constituency), 2010–present
 Elmet (novel), a 2017 novel by Fiona Mozley

See also
 Helmet
 Remains of Elmet, a 1979 poetry collection by Ted Hughes